The 2016 IIHF World Women's U18 Championship Division I and 2016 IIHF World Women's U18 Championship Division I Qualification were a pair of international under-18 women's ice hockey tournaments run by the International Ice Hockey Federation. The Division I and Division I Qualification tournaments made up the second and third level of competition at the 2016 IIHF World Women's U18 Championships respectively. The Division I tournament took place between 10 January and 16 January 2016 in Miskolc, Hungary. The tournament was won by Japan who gained promotion back to the Championship Division for 2017 while Denmark finished last and was placed in the newly formed Division I Group B tournament for 2017. The Division I Qualification tournament took place from 7 January to 11 January 2016 in Spittal an der Drau and Radenthein, Austria. Austria won the tournament defeating Italy in the final and gained promotion to Division I Group A for 2017. Italy, Kazakhstan, Great Britain, China and Poland were promoted to Division I Group B after finishing second through to sixth in the Division I Qualification tournament.

Division I tournament
The Division I tournament began on 10 January 2016 in Miskolc, Hungary at the Miskolc Arena. Germany, Hungary, Norway and Slovakia returned to compete in the Division I competition after missing promotion to the Championship Division at the previous years World Championships. Denmark gained promotion to the 2016 Division I tournament after finishing first in last years Division I Qualification and Japan was relegated from the Championship Division after failing to survive the relegation round at the 2015 IIHF World Women's U18 Championship.

Japan won the tournament after winning all five of their games, finishing first in the group standings and gained promotion back to the Championship Division for the 2017 IIHF World Women's U18 Championships. Germany finished in second place after losing only to Japan and Slovakia finished in third place. Denmark finished the tournament in last place after losing all five of their games and was relegated back to Division I Qualification for 2017. Ayu Tonosaki of Japan led the tournament in goaltending with a save percentage of 96.55 and was named the top goaltender by the IIHF directorate. Germany's Emily Nix and Norway's Millie Sirum finished as the top scorers of the tournament with eight points each which included two goals and six assists. Nix was also named as the tournaments best forward and Tatiana Ištocyová of Slovakia was named best defenceman.

Following the announcement of the 2017 World Championship program the IIHF revealed that the Division I tournament had been renamed to Division I Group A to allow for the creation of a Division I Group B tournament. As a result Denmark was placed in the Group B tournament for 2017 instead of the Qualification tournament.

Standings

Fixtures
All times are local. (CET – UTC+1)

Scoring leaders
List shows the top ten skaters sorted by points, then goals.

Leading goaltenders
Only the top five goaltenders, based on save percentage, who have played at least 40% of their team's minutes are included in this list.

Division I Qualification tournament
The Division I Qualification tournament began on 7 January 2016 in  Spittal an der Drau and Radenthein, Austria at the Eis Sport Arena and Nockhalle respectively. China, Great Britain, Italy, Kazakhstan and Poland returned to compete in the Division I Qualification competition after missing promotion to Division I at the previous years World Championships. Australia and Romania made their debut in the competition and Austria entered the tournament after being relegated from Division I at the 2015 IIHF World Women's U18 Championship.

The teams were divided into two groups of four for the preliminary round. Group A was won by Austria and Group B by Italy with both teams advancing to the gold medal game. Kazakhstan and Great Britain both advanced to the bronze medal game after finishing second in their groups. China and Poland made up the fifth place classification match after finishing third in the preliminary round and Australia and Romania were drawn against each other for the seventh place classification match. Austria defeated Italy 3–2 in the gold medal game to win the tournament and gain promotion back to Division I for the 2017 IIHF World Women's U18 Championships. Kazakhstan finished third after beating Great Britain 2–0 in the bronze medal game. Following the end of the tournament the IIHF directorate named China's Siye He best goaltender of the tournament, Italy's Nadia Mattivi best defenceman and Theresa Schafzahl of Austria best forward. Italy's Eugenia Pompanin led the tournament in goaltending with a save percentage of 93.81 and Malika Aldabergenova of Kazakhstan finished as the top scorer with twelve points which included five goals and seven assists.

Following the announcement of the 2017 World Championship program the IIHF revealed that the Division I tournament had been renamed to Division I Group A to allow for the creation of a Division I Group B tournament. As a result Austria was promoted to the Division I Group A tournament while Italy, Kazakhstan, Great Britain, China and Poland were promoted to the Division I Group B tournament.

Preliminary round

Group A

All times are local. (CET – UTC+1)

Group B

All times are local. (CET – UTC+1)

Playoff round

Seventh place game

Fifth place game

Bronze medal game

Gold medal game

Ranking and statistics

Final standings
The final standings of the tournament according to IIHF:

Scoring leaders
List shows the top ten skaters sorted by points, then goals.

Leading goaltenders
Only the top five goaltenders, based on save percentage, who have played at least 40% of their team's minutes are included in this list.

References

External links
Division I at IIHF.com
Division I Qualification at IIHF.com

IIHF World Women's U18 Championship - Division I
IIHF World Women's U18 Championship – Division I
International ice hockey competitions hosted by Austria
International ice hockey competitions hosted by Hungary
IIHF
IIHF